The Vienna Snooker Open is a pro–am snooker tournament held in Vienna, Austria.

The tournament was held for the first time in 2010, returned in 2012, and has been held annually since then. Mark King and Peter Ebdon have both won the tournament twice.

Winners

Notes

References

Snooker pro–am competitions
Recurring sporting events established in 2010
2010 establishments in Austria
Sports competitions in Vienna
Snooker in Austria